The Lord of the Isles or King of the Isles 
( or ) is a title of Scottish nobility with historical roots that go back beyond the Kingdom of Scotland. It began with Somerled in the 12th century and thereafter the title was held by a series of his descendants, the Norse-Gaelic rulers of the Isle of Man and Argyll and the islands of Scotland in the Middle Ages. They wielded sea-power with fleets of galleys (birlinns). Although they were, at times, nominal vassals of the Kings of Norway, Ireland, or Scotland, the island chiefs remained functionally independent for many centuries. Their territory included much of Argyll, the Isles of Arran, Bute, Islay, the Isle of Man, Hebrides (Skye and Ross from 1438), Knoydart, Ardnamurchan, and the Kintyre peninsula. At their height they were the greatest landowners and most powerful lords after the Kings of England and Scotland.

The end of the MacDonald Lords came in 1493 when John MacDonald II had his ancestral homeland, estates, and titles seized by King James IV of Scotland. Since that time, the MacDonald Clan had contested the right of James IV to the Lordship of the Isles and uprisings and rebellions against the Scottish Monarch were common. More recently, the Lordship of the Isles has been held by the Duke of Rothesay, the eldest son and heir apparent of the King of Scotland, a title which, since the creation of the Kingdom of Great Britain, is usually borne by the Prince of Wales. Thus Prince William is the current Lord of the Isles. 

Finlaggan on Islay was the seat of the Lords of the Isles under Somerled and Clan Donald.

Armorials
The arms adopted by the Lord of the Isles varied over time, but the blazon given and illustrated in "The Armorial of Sir David Lyndsay of the Mount" (1542) is: Or, an eagle Gules displayed beaked and membered Sable, surmounted by a galley also Sable. The red eagle first appeared on the arms with Donald Macdonald, Lord of the Isles, sometimes called Donald of Harlaw, for the battle he won in 1411.

Background

The west coast and islands of present-day Scotland were those of a people or peoples of uncertain cultural affiliation until the 5th century. They were invaded by Gaels from Ireland starting perhaps in the 4th century or earlier, whose language eventually predominated. In the 8th and 9th centuries this area, like others, suffered raids and invasions by Vikings from Norway, and the islands became known to the Gaels as Innse-Gall, the Islands of the Foreigners. Around 875, Norwegian jarls, or princes, came to these islands to avoid losing their independence in the course of King Harald Fairhair's unification of Norway, but Harald pursued them and conquered the Hebrides as well as Man, and the Shetland and Orkney Islands. The following year, the people of the Isles, both Gael and Norse, rebelled. Harald sent his cousin Ketill Flatnose to regain control, and Ketil then became King of the Isles. Scotland and Norway would continue to dispute overlordship of the area, with the jarls of Orkney at times seeing themselves as independent rulers.

In 973, Maccus mac Arailt, King of the Isles, Kenneth III, King of the Scots, and Máel Coluim I of Strathclyde formed a defensive alliance, but subsequently, the Scandinavians defeated Gilla Adomnáin of the Isles and expelled him to Ireland. The Norse nobleman Godred Crovan became ruler of Man and the Isles, but he was deposed in 1095 by the new King of Norway, Magnus Bareleg. In 1098, Magnus entered into a treaty with King Edgar of Scotland, intended as a demarcation of their respective areas of authority. Magnus was confirmed in control of the Isles and Edgar of the mainland. Lavery cites a tale from the Orkneyinga saga, according to which King Malcolm III of Scotland offered Earl Magnus of Orkney all the islands off the west coast navigable with the rudder set. Magnus then allegedly had a skiff hauled across the neck of land at Tarbert, Loch Fyne with himself at the helm, thus including the Kintyre peninsula in the Isles' sphere of influence. (The date given falls after the end of Malcolm's reign in 1093.)

Founding of the dynasties
Somerled, Gilledomman's grandson, seized the Isles (i.e. everything except the Isle of Man and Skye) beginning in 1135 (he gained the Isle of Man in 1156) and founded a dynasty that in time became the Lords of the Isles. It is thought he had Celtic/Gaelic blood on his father's side and Norse on his mother's: his contemporaries knew him as Somerled MacGillebride, Somhairle or in Norse Sumarlidi Höld (Sumarliðr is Old Norse for “summer warrior” or “summer traveler” in the sense of a Viking). Somerled took the title Lord of Argyll, Kintyre and Lorne and eventually Rí Innse Gall (King of the Hebrides) as well as King of Mann. His origins went back to the Norse Kings of Dublin and the great Ard-Rí, the High Kings of Ireland. They also speak of Colla Uais, a Celtic prince with influence in the Western Isles before the establishment of the kingdom of Dalriada.

After Somerled's death in 1164, three of his sons, and his brother-in-law (the King of Man), divided his realm between them:
 The King of Man : Man, Lewis, Harris, and Skye
 The sons of Somerled :
 Angus: unclear area, perhaps the remaining northern regions
 Dougall (ancestor of Clan MacDougall) : Morvern, Ardnamurchan, and Mull
 Ranald: unclear area, likely the southern regions, including Saddell Abbey

Angus was killed with his three sons in 1210, possibly by Ranald's sons, Ruaidhrí and Domhnall, as a result of Angus having defeated Ranald in 1192. Although Ruaidhrí originally seems to have held power in Kintyre, his later descendants held the lordship in the Hebrides and the lands that came to be known as Garmoran. It is possible that these territories were gained after Angus’ death, and the annihilation of his line. 
Donald Mor McRanald, who would give his name to the Clan Donald (which would contest territory with the MacDougalls) : Islay, Jura, Kintyre, Knapdale
Rory (ancestor of Clan Macruari) : Uist, Garmoran, Arran, and Bute

The MacDonald lordship

In their maritime domain the Lords of the Isles used galleys (birlinns) for both warfare and transport. Though they undoubtedly acquired longships from the Norse they defeated, the ships of the Dalriadic Scots and Irish and Islesmen predate the Viking longships and knarrs, clinker-built, though each had a square sail and rows of oars. "...literary evidence suggest[s] that the navies of the Dalriadic Scots and Irish were not insignificant". In the mid 12th century, Somerled, the first Lord of the Isles, developed the stern rudder that gave the galleys and longships sailed by the Islesmen greater maneuverability over the steering oar used by the Vikings. These ships took part in sea battles and attacked castles or hill forts almost always located close to the sea. The Lordship specified the feudal dues of its subjects in terms of numbers and sizes of the galleys (birlinns) each area had to provide in service to their Lord.

List of Clan Donald Lords of the Isles
Somerled
Ragnall
Donald
Angus Mor MacDonald
Alasdair Óg of Islay
Aonghus Og of Islay
John of Islay I, Lord of the Isles
Domhnall of Islay, Lord of the Isles
Alexander of Islay, Earl of Ross and Lord of the Isles
John of Islay II, Earl of Ross and Lord of the Isles
Angus Óg

Council of the Isles

The Lord was advised (at least on an occasional basis) by a Council. Dean Monro of the Isles, who wrote a description of the Western Isles in 1549, described the membership as consisting of four ranks:
 Four "great men of the royal blood of Clan Donald lineally descended" (MacDonald of Clanranald, MacDonald of Dunnyvaig, MacIain of Ardnamurchan and MacDonald of Keppoch)
 Four "greatest of the nobles, called lords" (Maclean of Duart, Maclaine of Lochbuie, Macleod of Dunvegan and Macleod of the Lewes)
 Four "thanes of less living and estate" (Mackinnon of Strath, MacNeil of Barra, MacNeill of Gigha and Macquarrie of Ulva)
 "Freeholders or men that had their lands in factory" (Mackay of the Rhinns, MacNicol of Scorrybreac, MacEacharn of Kilellan, Mackay of Ugadale, Macgillivray in Mull and Macmillan of Knapdale).

In practice, membership and attendance must have varied with the times and the occasion. A commission granted in July 1545 by Domhnall Dubh, claimant to the Lordship, identified the following members:
 Hector Maclean of Duart
 John Macdonald of Clanranald
 Ruari Macleod of the Lewes
 Alexander Macleod of Dunvegan
 Murdoch Maclaine of Lochbuie
 Allan Maclean of Torloisk
 Archibald Macdonald, Captain of Clann Uisdein
 Alexander MacIan of Ardnamurchan
 John Maclean of Coll
 Gilleonan MacNeil of Barra
 Ewen Mackinnon of Strath
 John MacQuarrie of Ulva
 John Maclean of Ardgour
 Alexander Macdonell of Glengarry
 Angus Macdonald of Knoydart
 Donald Maclean of Kingairloch
 Angus Macdonald, brother of James Macdonald of Dunnyveg.

End of the MacDonald lordship
Successive Lords of the Isles fiercely asserted their independence from Scotland, acting as kings of their territories well into the 15th century. Then in 1462, John MacDonald II Lord of the Isles signed a treaty with Edward IV of England to conquer Scotland with him and the Earl of Douglas. The treaty between Edward IV and John II has been used to show how the MacDonald Lords were viewed as independent rulers of their kingdom, freely entering into national and military treaties with foreign governments. Unfortunately for the MacDonald sovereigns, the civil war in England, known as the Wars of the Roses, prevented the completion of the alliance between Edward IV and John II. Upon the discovery of his alliance with Edward IV in 1493, John II had his ancestral lands, estates, and titles taken from him by James IV of Scotland. In addition to James IV seeking revenge on John II, he possessed a larger military force and was able to impose his will on the West Coast of Scotland, though uprisings and rebellions were common. Though the Lordship was taken away from the MacDonald family in the 15th century, waves of successive MacDonald leaders have contested this and fought for its revival ever since, notably during Dubh's Rebellion. Since then, the eldest male child of the reigning Scottish (and later, British) monarch has been styled "Lord of the Isles", essentially merging the crowns of Dal Riada with the Pictish East of Scotland. The office itself has been extinct since the 15th century and the style since then has no other meaning but to recall the Scottish seizure of the ancient Norse-Gaelic lordship and crown. Currently William, Prince of Wales is titular Lord of the Isles, as well as Duke of Rothesay, Earl of Carrick, Baron of Renfrew and Prince and Great Steward of Scotland.

See also
Lord of Islay
Kingdom of the Isles
Donald Dubh
Battle of Harlaw

Footnotes

References
 Bannerman, J., The Lordship of the Isles, in Scottish Society in the Fifteenth Century, ed. J. M. Brown, 1977.
 Brown M, James I, 1994.
 Dunbar, J., The Lordship of the Isles, in The Middle Ages in the Highlands, Inverness Field Club, 1981 .
 Gregory, D., History of the Western Highlands and Islands of Scotland, 1975 reprint.
 MacDonald, C. M., The History of Argyll, 1950.
 McDonald, R. A., The Kingdom of the Isles: Scotland's Western Seaboard, 1100–c1336, 1997.
 Munro. J., The Earldom of Ross and the Lordship of the Isles, in Firthlands of Ross and Sutherland, ed. J. R. Baldwin, 1986.

Feudalism in Scotland
Clan Donald
Scottish royalty
Succession to the British crown
Titles in Scotland
Scottish monarchs